is a Japanese former swimmer. She competed in four events at the 1968 Summer Olympics.

References

External links
 

1950 births
Living people
Japanese female butterfly swimmers
Japanese female freestyle swimmers
Japanese female medley swimmers
Olympic swimmers of Japan
Swimmers at the 1968 Summer Olympics
Sportspeople from Fukuoka Prefecture
Asian Games medalists in swimming
Asian Games gold medalists for Japan
Swimmers at the 1966 Asian Games
Medalists at the 1966 Asian Games
20th-century Japanese women